Ensminger  may refer to:

 Chris Ensminger (born 1973), American basketball coach and former player
 Death of Janey Ensminger (1976-1985), died from contaminated drinking water
 John Ensminger (disambiguation), several people
 Steve Ensminger (born 1958), American football coach and former player